The Mershon Center for International Security Studies  is a research institute at the Ohio State University. The current director is Dorothy Noyes.

History
The Mershon Center was founded in 1952 upon the death of Ralph D. Mershon, an alumnus of the school, who left funds to the university for the establishment of a research institute dedicated to the fields of international relations and security. Many schools founded similar centers due to the aftermath of World War II such as the Arnold A. Saltzman Institute of War and Peace Studies at Columbia University.

The first director of the Mershon Center was Edgar S. Furniss Jr., who was appointed in 1960. However, he would die unexpectedly only six years later. Fellows throughout the years have included Francis Beer, Erika Bourguignon, Ofer Feldman, Azar Gat, Margaret Hermann, David P. Houghton, Kimberly Marten, Robert J. McMahon, Margaret Mills, John Mueller, Mary Ellen O'Connell, Allan Silverman, Alexander Stephan.

The Mershon Center houses scholars from a variety of fields, including doctoral students, visiting fellows, and permanent faculty affiliates.

Furniss Book Award
In 1982, then-director Charles F. Hermann initiated a book award in honor of the first director of the center, Edgar S. Furniss Jr. The award is presented annually to a scholar whose "...first book makes an exceptional contribution to the study of national and international security."

Notable recipients have included: Harry G. Summers Jr. (1982), John Mearsheimer (1983), Barry Posen (1984), Bruce G. Blair (1986), Andrew Krepinevich (1987), Stephen Walt (1988), Aaron Friedberg (1989), Stephen Peter Rosen (1992), Michael E. Brown (1993), James Goldgeier (1995), Lars-Erik Cederman (1998), Robert D. English (2000), Matthew Connelly (2002), Benjamin Valentino (2004), Michael C. Horowitz (2010), and Keren Yarhi-Milo (2014).

Directors
 Edgar S. Furniss Jr. (1960–1966)
 James A. Robinson (1966–1970)
 Richard C. Snyder (1970–1980)
 Charles F. Hermann (1980–1995)
 Richard Ned Lebow (1996–2000)
 Richard Herrmann (2002–2011)
 J. Craig Jenkins (2011–2015)
 Christopher Gelpi (2018–2022)
 Dorothy Noyes (2022–present)

See also
History of Ohio State University
Timeline of Columbus, Ohio

References

External links
Official website

Ohio State University
University research institutes
1952 establishments in Ohio